This list is an incomplete list of the recipients of the Gold Star Order of Vietnam

Vietnamese

Foreigners

Sources
Danh sách cá nhân, tập thể được trao tặng Huân chương Sao Vàng

Orders, decorations, and medals of Vietnam